Parotosuchus is an extinct genus of capitosaurian temnospondyl amphibians within the family Mastodonsauridae. Fossils are known from the Early Triassic of Europe, Africa, Australia, and Antarctica. Parotosuchus was covered in a scaly skin, unlike the smooth skin of modern-day amphibians, and probably moved with an eel-like motion in the water.

Parotosuchus was originally named Parotosaurus. However, the name Parotosaurus was preoccupied by a genus of skinks, and in 1968 the name Parotosuchus was proposed as a replacement. The name Archotosaurus was also proposed as a replacement name in 1976, although the author who proposed this was unaware that Parotosuchus was already in use. Because the name Parotosuchus was erected earlier than Archotosaurus, it has priority.

References

Further reading
Parotosuchus (Temnospondyli: Mastodonsauridae) from the Triassic of Antarctica. Christian A. Sidor, J. Sebastien Steyer and Ross Damiani, Journal of Vertebrate Paleontology, 2007, 27(1):232–235

Prehistoric amphibians of Australia
Triassic temnospondyls of Africa
Extinct animals of Antarctica
Triassic temnospondyls of Antarctica
Triassic temnospondyls of Australia
Triassic temnospondyls of Europe
Early Triassic amphibians of Africa
Fossil taxa described in 1968
Prehistoric amphibian genera